Nithar Ke (Punjabi) is a village of Bhawana tehsil in district of Chiniot, Punjab, Pakistan. Its population is approximately 2,000. The nearest big city is Bhawana.

Villages in Chiniot District